Trillium rugelii, also known as the southern nodding trillium or illscented wakerobin, is a species of flowering plant in the family Melanthiaceae. It is native to parts of the southeastern United States. It is found in the Great Smoky Mountains, Fernbank Forest, Steven's Creek Heritage Preserve, and other places of the Piedmont and southern Appalachian Mountains in Alabama, Georgia, South Carolina, North Carolina and Tennessee. It prefers to grow near streams in humus-rich soil under the shade of deciduous trees.

Trillium rugelii is a perennial herbaceous plant that blooms mid April to May. Like some other trillium species (such as T. catesbaei, T. cernuum, and T. vaseyi), its flower hangs below the leaves. In the past, many authors incorrectly cited specimens as Trillium cernuum, which has a similar though smaller flower with shorter stamens and thinner petals. Also, T. cernuum grows farther north and is less robust.

Status

As of 2009 the species is endangered in Tennessee, Georgia, and other parts of the United States.

Bibliography

References

External links 

 

rugelii
Flora of the Southeastern United States
Flora of the Appalachian Mountains
Endemic flora of the United States